Pachyplectron is a genus of flowering plants from the orchid family, Orchidaceae. The genus contains three species, all endemic to New Caledonia. The genus is related to Odontochilus.

Species of Pachyplectron

Pachyplectron aphyllum T.Hashim., Ann. Tsukuba Bot. Gard. 16: 7 (1997).
Pachyplectron arifolium Schltr., Bot. Jahrb. Syst. 39: 52 (1906).
Pachyplectron neocaledonicum Schltr., Bot. Jahrb. Syst. 39: 52 (1906).

See also 
 List of Orchidaceae genera

References 

 Berg Pana, H. 2005. Handbuch der Orchideen-Namen. Dictionary of Orchid Names. Dizionario dei nomi delle orchidee. Ulmer, Stuttgart

External links 

Goodyerinae
Endemic flora of New Caledonia
Orchids of New Caledonia
Cranichideae genera